North Korea has built dozens of reserve airstrips along highways and ordinary roads. These airfields are little more than widened sections of pavement that appear to be for emergency or backup use only and may not normally support operations. They are listed as "Highway" or "Highway Strip".

See also

 List of airports in North Korea
 Transport in North Korea

References

Highway strips
North Korea
 
Airports
Airports, highway strips